Joanna MacKinnon (12 November 1878–26 August 1966) was a New Zealand plunket nurse. She was born in Balmeanach, near Camastianavaig on the island of Skye, Scotland on 12 November 1878. She was instrumental in the establishment of Royal New Zealand Plunket Society.

References

1878 births
1966 deaths
New Zealand nurses
Scottish emigrants to New Zealand
New Zealand women nurses
People from the Isle of Skye
Place of death missing